Per-Gunnar "Peggen" Andersson (born 15 August 1957) is a race car driver from Falkenberg, Sweden.

He started his career in Sweden in 1980. In 1988 he won the Thai Touring Car Championship and the Swedish Touring Car Championship. He won the Swedish championship again in 1989, 1991 and 1992. In the 1980s Andersson also competed in DTM and the British Touring Car Championship.

In 1993 and 1995 he won the Nordic Touring Car Championship. Since then he has returned to Swedish touring cars, finishing his career at the end of 2001 after driving for Carly BMW in the European Touring Car Championship.

Today, Andersson works as a commentator in the Swedish broadcast of DTM for Canal+.

Racing record

Complete European Touring Car Championship results
(key) (Races in bold indicate pole position) (Races in italics indicate fastest lap)

Complete Deutsche Tourenwagen Meisterschaft results
(key) (Races in bold indicate pole position) (Races in italics indicate fastest lap)

Complete British Touring Car Championship results
(key) (Races in bold indicate pole position) (Races in italics indicate fastest lap)

‡ Endurance driver (Ineligible for points in 1990)

Complete Swedish Touring Car Championship results
(key) (Races in bold indicate pole position) (Races in italics indicate fastest lap)

Complete European Super Production Championship results
(key) (Races in bold indicate pole position) (Races in italics indicate fastest lap)

References

External links
https://web.archive.org/web/20111003162607/http://www.pgandersson.se/

1957 births
Swedish Touring Car Championship drivers
Swedish racing drivers
British Touring Car Championship drivers
People from Falkenberg
Living people
European Touring Car Championship drivers
Sportspeople from Halland County